James John Kennedy (7 May 1884 – 20 July 1947) was a Scottish professional footballer who played for Celtic,  Brighton & Hove Albion, Leeds City, Stockport County, Tottenham Hotspur, Swindon Town, Norwich City, Watford and Gillingham.

Football career 
Kennedy played for Celtic and Brighton & Hove Albion before joining Leeds City in 1906. The defender played in 60 matches and scored once between 1906–1908 for the Yorkshire club. He moved to Stockport County where he played a further 20 matches before joining Tottenham Hotspur. Kennedy featured in 13 matches and scored once in his career at White Hart Lane, which was followed by short spells at Swindon Town and Norwich City. He then joined Watford, captaining them to the Southern League title in 1914–15 after his predecessor Alex Stewart enlisted for military service. He joined Brentford during the First World War and played as a guest for Aidrieonians and St Mirren. Upon the resumption of peacetime football in 1919, Kennedy finished his career at Gillingham. He served as the club's trainer between 1920 and 1922 and then acted as trainer for Partick Thistle until his death in 1947.

References

External links
Kennedy fact-file

1880s births
1947 deaths
Footballers from Dundee
Scottish footballers
English Football League players
Celtic F.C. players
Brighton & Hove Albion F.C. players
Leeds City F.C. players
Stockport County F.C. players
Tottenham Hotspur F.C. players
Swindon Town F.C. players
Norwich City F.C. players
Gillingham F.C. players
Watford F.C. players
Association football wing halves
Scottish Football League players
Southern Football League players
Brentford F.C. players
Airdrieonians F.C. (1878) wartime guest players
St Mirren F.C. wartime guest players
Gillingham F.C. non-playing staff
Partick Thistle F.C. non-playing staff